Zuiderduintjes is an uninhabited island in the Wadden Sea in the Netherlands. It is situated south of Rottumeroog, east of Rottumerplaat, and west of Borkum. The island is one of the three West Frisian Islands in the municipality of Het Hogeland and in the province of Groningen.

Zuiderduintjes is part of the nature reserve Rottum and access to the island is prohibited.

Geography 

Zuiderduintjes is one of the West Frisian Islands in the Wadden Sea. It is situated off the coast of Groningen's mainland, south of the island of Rottumeroog, east of the island of Rottumerplaat, and southwest of the East Frisian island of Borkum.

History 
Zuiderduintjes was part of the island of Rottumeroog, but has separated from it around 1930 and has since moved further southeast.

Natural reserve 
Zuiderduintjes is part of the nature reserve Rottum. Access to the island is prohibited since it is a resting and foraging area for birds and seals.

The island has a dune and salt marsh vegetation, and its plants include Elytrigia juncea subsp. boreoatlantica, Sonchus arvensis var. maritimus, Chenopodium album, Chenopodium rubrum, Matricaria maritima, Atriplex littoralis, Descurainia sophia, Artemisia maritima, Festuca rubra, Elytrigia maritima, Salicornia procumbens, and Suaeda maritima.

References

External links 
 

Het Hogeland
Islands of Groningen (province)
Uninhabited islands of the Netherlands
West Frisian Islands